Unxiini is a tribe of beetles in the subfamily Cerambycinae, found in South America.

The following genera belong to this tribe:

 Allopeba Napp & Reynaud, 1999
 Chariergus Thomson, 1860
 Chenoderus Fairmaire & Germain, 1859
 Ethemon Thomson, 1864
 Paromoeocerus Gounelle, 1910
 Parunxia Napp, 1977
 Rierguscha Viana, 1970
 Unxia Thomson, 1860

References

 
Cerambycinae